Christinus guentheri is a species of lizard in the family Gekkonidae (geckos). The species is endemic to two Australian islands, Norfolk Island and Lord Howe Island.

Common names
C. guentheri has the common names Günther's island gecko, Lord Howe Island gecko, and  Lord Howe Island southern gecko.

Taxonomy
The first description of C. guentheri was by Belgian-born British herpetologist George Albert Boulenger, in 1885, as Phyllodactylus guentheri.

Etymology
The specific epithet, guentheri, commemorates German-born British zoologist Albert Günther.

Conservation status
C. guentheri is listed as vulnerable by the IUCN, and by the Australian government's EPBC act.

References

Further reading
Wells RW, Wellington CR (1984) ("1983"). "A Synopsis of the Class Reptilia in Australia". Australian Journal of Herpetology 1 (3-4): 73–129. (Christinus guentheri, new combination, p. 75).

External links

Christinus
Fauna of Norfolk Island
Reptiles described in 1885
Taxonomy articles created by Polbot
Geckos of Australia
Fauna of Lord Howe Island